Eduardo de Oliveira Coutinho (May 11, 1933 – February 2, 2014) was a Brazilian film director, screen writer, actor and film producer, known as one of the most important documentarists in Brazil.

He directed and wrote the script to the 1967 popular Brazilian film, ABC do amor near the beginning of his career. The film was entered into the 17th Berlin International Film Festival.

He died on February 2, 2014, in a suspected murder in Rio de Janeiro. His son, who has schizophrenia, is a prime suspect in the ongoing investigation.

Biography
Born in São Paulo in 1933, Coutinho was a law school graduate. He worked as copy editor at the magazine Visão between 1954 and 1957, and after that he went to France to study film direction at the Institut des Hautes Études Cinématographiques.

Back to Brazil in 1960, Coutinho collaborated with the Centro Popular de Cultura - CPC (Popular Center of Culture), an intellectual group associated to the Brazilian National Student Union, where he produced the 1962 film Cinco Vezes Favela.

Chosen to direct CPC's next production, Coutinho started to work in a fiction based on the death of João Pedro Teixeira, a peasant leader of the Ligas Camponesas in Pernambuco, titled Cabra marcado para morrer. The own rural workers would play themselves in the film, including Elizabeth, Teixeira's widow. The production was interrupted by the 1964 military coup d'état, and part of the production was imprisoned. After the end of dictatorship in Brazil, in 1985, the film was resumed, but as a documentary with shots of the original film and interviews of the surviving production members.

In 1966, Coutinho has constituted a film production company with Leon Hirszman and Marcos Faria. He wrote and directed ABC do Amor in 1967, The Man who Bought the World (1968) and Faustão (1970).

Later he has specialized in screenwriting, being a writer for films such as Dona Flor and Her Two Husbands (1976). Between 1976 and 1984, Coutinho was part of the crew of TV program Globo Repórter.

Filmography

References

External links
 

1933 births
2014 deaths
Male actors from São Paulo
Brazilian male film actors
Brazilian film producers
Brazilian screenwriters
Brazilian documentary filmmakers